Amazonia refers to the Amazon rainforest.  

Amazonia may also refer to:

Places
Amazonia, Missouri, a village in the US
Amazon basin, the river basin drained by the Amazon River
Amazon biome, a biome that covers most of the Amazon basin and some adjoining areas
Amazon natural region, a region of Colombia
Amazon Region (Ecuador)
Amazônia Legal, the largest socio-geographic division in Brazil
Amazônia National Park, Brazil
Amazonian Craton, a craton in the Precambrian
Amazons, also known as Amazonia, a queendom in Scythian (Altai Mountains) and Greek (Anatolia, Turkey) mythology 
French Guiana, seeking Independence as the Republic of Amazonia
North Region, Brazil, also known as Amazônia
Peruvian Amazon, the portion of the Amazon basin in Peru

Arts, entertainment, and media

Films
Amazonia (film), a 2013 documentary film
White Slave (film), a 1985 horror film, also known as Amazonia: The Catherine Miles Story

Other uses in arts, entertainment, and media
Amazonia (2002), an action-adventure novel by James Rollins
Amazônia (album), a 2021 album by Jean-Michel Jarre
Amazonia, a fictional kingdom of women in The Book of the City of Ladies
Wonder Woman: Amazonia, a one-shot comic book about Wonder Woman
"Amazonia", the second single from the 2021 album Fortitude (album) by Gojira

Other uses
Amazonia (fungus), a genus of fungi
Amazônia-1, a Brazilian satellite
Amazonian languages, the indigenous languages of "Greater Amazonia"
MV Geysir, a cargo ship originally named Amazonia
The Amazonia Conference, a global warming activist organization
Universidad de la Amazonía (University of the Amazon), a public university in Florencia, Caquetá, Colombia

See also
Amazon (disambiguation)
Ambazonia
Amazonis Planitia